The Van Wert Buckeyes were a minor league baseball club, based in Van Wert, Ohio, in 1908.  The team was a member of the Class-D Indiana-Ohio League. However,  after only a month of play, a long series of financial losses by each club in the league had caused the league and the team to disband.

Team record

References

1908 establishments in Ohio
Defunct baseball teams in Ohio
Baseball teams established in 1908
Baseball teams disestablished in 1908
1908 disestablishments in Ohio